The Welsh Covered Court Championships  its original name also called Welsh Covered Court Lawn Tennis Championships was a tennis event held from 1893 through 1955 in Wales, United Kingdom.

History
The Welsh Covered Court Championships was  played at the Craigside Hydro Badmington and Tennis Club on indoor courts, the club also had outdoor courts, Llandudno, Wales.

Champions
Notes: Challenge round: The final round of a tournament, in which the winner of a single-elimination phase faces the previous year's champion, who plays only that one match. The challenge round was used in the early history of tennis (from 1877 through 1921) in some tournaments not all. (c) indicates challenger

Men's singles

Women's singles
Notes: The women's tournaments of 1894 and 1895 were played twice yearly in * April and ** October.

See also
Tennis Wales

Notes

Sources
 Ayre's Lawn Tennis Almanack And Tournament Guide, A. Wallis Myers. UK.
 Dunlop Lawn Tennis Almanack and Tournament Guide, G.P. Hughes, 1939 to 1958, Published by Dunlop Sports Co. Ltd, UK.
 Lawn Tennis and Badminton Magazines, 1896–1901, Amateur Sports Publishing Co. Ltd, London, UK.
 Lawn Tennis and Croquet Magazines, 1901–1920, Amateur Sports Publishing Co. Ltd, London, UK.
 Lowe's Lawn Tennis Annuals and Compendia, Lowe, Sir F. Gordon, Eyre & Spottiswoode, London, UK.

External links
 Victorian web – Short history of the Hydro Hotel
 Tennis Archive: Welsh Covered Court Championships – Roll of Honour
 The Tennis Base: Welsh Covered Court Championships – Roll of Honour

Defunct tennis tournaments in the United Kingdom
Indoor tennis tournaments
Tennis tournaments in Wales
Wood court tennis tournaments